KTTI (95.1 FM) is a radio station licensed to serve Yuma, Arizona, United States and also serving El Centro, California. The station is owned by El Dorado Broadcasters LLC. It airs a country music format.

History

KALJ
KALJ took to the air on November 6, 1970. The station was owned by Lan-Jol Enterprises, owned by Robert Langill and Joel Pollard (the call letters stood for Arizona Lan-Jol).

KTTI

KALJ was sold and went silent on December 31, 1978, in preparation to relaunch two weeks later under new ownership as KTTI, an automated beautiful music outlet. The new owners were Purr Broadcasting, owned by former KBLU-TV/KYEL advertising manager Jim Evans and businessman Rick Richmond. KTTI flipped formats to country on October 1, 1981.
Sun Country Broadcasting bought KTTI and KBLU at the same time in 1983.

KBLU and KTTI were owned by Robert Tezak, the owner of Uno, from 1988 to 1995. That year, they were purchased out of bankruptcy by Commonwealth Broadcasting, owner of KYJT (now KQSR). In a quick succession of owners, Commonwealth was acquired by Capstar in 1997, Capstar merged with Chancellor Broadcasting to form AMFM in 1998, and Clear Channel acquired AMFM in 1999.

Clear Channel sold its Yuma stations to current owner El Dorado Broadcasters in 2007.

KTTI is programmed by Program Director Jeff Edwards, who also serves as KTTI music director. Jeff also hosts the midday show. The weekday line-up includes After Midnight with Blair Garner from midnight to 5am and Big D & Bubba from 5 to 10am. David Horner afternoons 3 to 7 and Whitney Allen The Big Time Show from 7pm to midnight.

References

External links
 KTTI official website
 

TTI
Country radio stations in the United States
1970 establishments in Arizona
Radio stations established in 1970